Loy Krathong is a Thai festival celebrated annually throughout Thailand and  in nearby countries with significant South Western Tai cultures (Laos, Shan, Mon, Tanintharyi, Kelantan, Kedah, and Xishuangbanna). The name could be translated as "to float ritual vessel or lamp," and comes from the tradition of making krathong or buoyant, decorated baskets, which are then floated on a river. Many Thais use the krathong to thank the Goddess of Water, Phra Mae Khongkha or to worship the Buddha's hair pagoda in heaven. This festival traces its origin back to India.

Loy Krathong takes place on the evening of the full moon of the 12th month in the traditional Thai lunar calendar, thus the exact date of the festival changes every year. In the Western calendar this usually falls in the month of November. In Chiang Mai, the festival lasts three days, and in 2018, the dates were 21–23 November.

In Thailand, the festival is known as Loi Krathong. Outside Thailand, this festival is celebrated under different names, including Myanmar as the "Tazaungdaing festival", Sri Lanka as "Il Full Moon Poya", China as "Lantern Festival" and Cambodia as Bon Om Touk".

Overview

A krathong is traditionally a small floating container fashioned of leaves which is made to hold a small portion of goods like a traditional Thai dish (such as hor mok) or dessert. The traditional krathong used for floating at the festival are made from a slice of a banana tree trunk or a spider lily plant. Modern krathongs are more often made of bread or Styrofoam. A bread krathong will disintegrate after a few days and can be eaten by fish. Banana stalk krathongs are also biodegradable, but Styrofoam krathongs are increasingly banned, as they pollute rivers and oceans. A krathong is decorated with elaborately-folded banana leaves, three incense sticks, and a candle. A small coin is sometimes included as an offering to the river spirits. On the night of the full moon, Thais launch their krathong on a river, canal, or a pond, making a wish as they do so. The floats are thought to have been introduced to Chiang Mai in 1947 and have since been incorporated into Thai culture. Government offices, corporations, and other organizations launch large decorated krathongs. There are competitions for the best of these large krathongs. Beauty contests often accompany the festivities and fireworks also have become common.

Loy Krathong possibly originated from Angkor in Khmer Empire. Walls of Bayon, a temple built by King Jayavarman VII in the 12th century, depicts scenes of Loy Krathong. A bas relief on the upper level depicts a queen residing on the boat to float the krathong in the river whereas six other royal concubines are depicted below, some of which are holding the krathong and dedicating at the riverbank in a similar tradition practiced in present-day Cambodia, Thailand, and other Southeast Asian countries.

Recently, it has been accepted that Loy Krathong in Thailand is the festival mixed and combined three important cultural festivals from Bondet Bratib of Khmer Empire, Water Lantern of China and the festival of Kartik Purnima celebrated in the eastern state of Odisha in India. This festival is called Boita Bandana which is observed on the Kartik Purnima or full moon day of Kartik month (which corresponds to October–November) in Odia calendar. Loy Krathong festivities are usually celebrated during the period which corresponds to Kartik Purnima. Odisha being part of the ancient Kalinga which had strong maritime trade relations with Southeast Asia, the similarities in all these festivals may not be coincidental.

Etymology 
According to the 1999 Royal Institute Dictionary, loi (ลอย) means 'to float', while krathong (กระทง) has various meanings, one of which is 'a small vessel made of leaves which can be floated on water during the Loy Krathong festival. Moreover, according to the Royal Society of Thailand, the word krathong (กระทง) is derived from Old Chinese word 鐙 or 燈 (/*k-tˤəŋ/) which means ritual vessel or lamp. However, other sources believe krathong (กระทง) to be a derivate of the Khmer word kantong (កន្ទោង), which has a similar pronunciation and the same meaning.

History

Legend in Sukhothai Kingdom Period 
Loy Krathong is once said to have begun in the Sukhothai Kingdom by a court lady named Nopphamat. However, it is now known that the Nopphamat tale comes from a poem written in the early-Bangkok period. According to King Rama IV, writing in 1863, it was a Hindu festival that was adapted by Thai Buddhists in Thailand to honour the Buddha, Prince Siddhartha Gautama. The candle venerates the Buddha with light, while the krathong's floating away symbolises letting go of all one's hatred, anger, and defilements. People sometimes cut their fingernails or hair and place the clippings on the krathong as a symbol of letting go of past transgressions and negative thoughts. Many Thais use the krathong to thank the Goddess of Water, the Hindu Goddess Ganga, Phra Mae Khongkha.

Ayutthaya Kingdom and Lavo Kingdom Period 
Simon de la Loubère led an embassy to Siam (modern Thailand) in 1687 (the "La Loubère-Céberet mission").  Upon his return, La Loubère wrote a description of his travels, as had been requested by Louis XIV, published under the title Du Royaume de Siam. Loy Krathong festival was mentioned in his book in the sixth chapter of part two called Concerning the Shows, and other Diverſion of the Siameſes: Religious Shows: An Illumination on the Waters, and another on the Land, and in the Palace.

Rattanakosin Kingdom Period 
The beauty contests that accompany the festival are known as "Nopphamat Queen Contests" has been promoted since the reign of King Rama III. Since the country became peaceful after getting involved with many wars, King Rama III ordered the palace officers and people to revive and promote the important festivals of the kingdom, such as Loy Krathong. According to legend written on the poem, Nang Nopphamat (alternatively spelled as "Noppamas" or "Nopamas") was a consort of the 13th century Sukhothai King Sri Indraditya (who is also known as Phra Ruang) and she reputedly was the first to float a decorated raft. However, this tale may have been invented in the early-19th century. There is no evidence that a Nang Nopphamat ever existed. Instead, it is a fact that a woman of this name was the leading character of a novel released at the end of the reign of King Rama III, around 1850 CE. Her character was written as guidance for all women who wished to become civil servants. Kelantan in Malaysia celebrates Loy Krathong similarly, especially in the Tumpat area. The ministry in charge of tourism in Malaysia recognizes it as an attraction for tourists.

Lanna Kingdom Period and later Northern Part of Thailand

Loy Krathong coincides with the Lanna (northern Thai) festival known as Yi Peng. Yi means 'two' and peng means a 'full moon day'. Yi Peng refers to the full moon day in the second month according to the Lanna lunar calendar (the twelfth month of the Thai lunar calendar). The festival is meant as a time to make merit.

Swarms of sky lanterns, literally: 'floating lanterns', are launched into the air.  Khom loi are made from a thin fabric, such as rice paper, stretched over a bamboo or wire frame, to which a candle or fuel cell is attached. When the fuel cell is lit, the resulting hot air is trapped inside the lantern and creates enough lift for the khom loi to float into the sky.  During the festival, some people also decorate their houses, gardens, and temples with khom fai, intricately shaped paper lanterns which take on different forms. Khom thue are lanterns which are carried around hanging from a stick, khom khwaen are the hanging lanterns, and khom pariwat, which are placed at temples and which revolve due to the heat of the candle inside. The most elaborate Yi Peng celebrations can be seen in Chiang Mai, the ancient capital of the former Lanna kingdom, where now both Loy Krathong and Yi Peng are celebrated at the same time resulting in lights floating on the waters, lights hanging from trees/buildings or standing on walls, and lights floating in the sky. The tradition of Yi Peng was also adopted by certain parts of Laos during the 16th century.

The aftermath

In 2016, the Bangkok Metropolitan Administration (BMA) cleaned six tonnes of rubbish from the city's waterways on the day after Loy Krathong. The city governor said that 661,935 floats were collected from waterways across Bangkok. Of these, 617,901 (93.7 percent) were made of decomposible natural materials, while 44,034 were non-biodegradable Styrofoam floats. There were 163,679 fewer krathong collected than in 2015. The city mobilized 210 workers and 45 boats to collect floats from the Chao Phraya River and canals.

In 2017, because the sky lanterns are a hazard to passing aircraft and "...can cause damage to important places in the areas such as the Grand Palace [sic], temples and governmental offices,..." khom loi are increasingly subject to governmental restrictions. In Chiang Mai, authorities cancelled 78 flights in and out of Chiang Mai Airport on 3–4 November 2017. Another 79 flights were rescheduled. Despite those measures, the remains of more than 100 lanterns were later found on airport premises. In Bangkok, the public are prohibited from using fireworks and sky lanterns entirely. Violators may face three years imprisonment and/or a fine of 60,000 baht. One hundred-ninety piers on the Chao Phraya River will be open to the public to float their krathongs. In 2018, up to 158 flights were cancelled or rescheduled at three airports, and in Bangkok 88 piers were closed.

In 2017, in Nakhon Ratchasima province, 50 workers collected krathong from the moat in the town centre near the Thao Suranaree Monument. In Buriram, more than 200 workers and volunteers in Mueang District cleared at least 20,000 krathong from the town's moat. There, Styrofoam krathong will be banned in 2017. In Lampang, more than 100 students and teachers from the Institute of Physical Education helped municipal workers clean up the Wang River in Mueang District.

In 2018, after the festivities, Bangkok city workers cleared 841,327 krathongs, up from 3.6 percent in 2017, from the Chao Phraya River, local canals, and 30 public parks; 5.3 percent of them were made from styrofoam.

Gallery

See also
Public holidays in Thailand
Thai folklore
Similar festivals
Tazaungdaing festival – Myanmar equivalent of Loy Krathong
Mid-Autumn Festival - Chinese autumn lantern festival where the water lantern or lamp has been used for floating
Boita Bandana – Odia autumn festival when people float miniature boats with lighted lamps (diyas) on the rivers/sea.
Diwali – Indian light festival
Karthika Deepam - festival of lights observed in Kerala, Tamil Nadu and Sri Lanka.
Tōrō nagashi – Japanese lantern festival
Leaf boat
Thanksgiving

Notes

References

External links

 Sukhothai celebrations
 Tourism Authority of Thailand (TAT) Loi Krathong Information

Buddhist holidays
Buddhist festivals in Thailand
November observances
Articles containing video clips
Thai culture
Observances set by the Thai lunar calendar
Bananas in culture
Observances held on the full moon